Hojagala is a village in south-western Turkmenistan, in Magtymguly District, Balkan Province, south of the city of Serdar. It is the seat of Daghojagala geňeşligi (rural council). South of the village are upper catchments of the Atrek River.

This village should not be confused with the town of the same name in Çärjew District, Lebap Province.

References

Populated places in Balkan Region